is a Japanese voice actress and singer affiliated with I'm Enterprise.

Biography
Hikasa became interested in acting while watching Sailor Moon and Neon Genesis Evangelion. She attended Nihon Narration Engi Kenkyūjo, a voice actor training school. She formed a pop music group Ro-Kyu-Bu!, with Kana Hanazawa, Yuka Iguchi, Rina Hidaka and Yui Ogura. It takes the name for each characters for the anime series Ro-Kyu-Bu!. Their first single "Shoot!" was released on August 17, 2011 and was used as the opening theme for the series. The album Pure Elements was released on October 5, 2011. Hikasa has been married since 2015.

On August 23, 2022, she tested positive for COVID-19. She took a PCR test and went into quarantine after she was told that she was a close contact with someone with COVID-19. She is currently being treated with guidance from the health center and medical institution.

Filmography

Television animation
2007
Sketchbook ~full color'S~, Minamo Negishi

2008
Ghost Hound, Female Elementary School Student B (ep 12)
Monochrome Factor, Schoolgirl (ep 5)

2009
Asura Cryin', Ritsu Shioizumi
Asura Cryin' 2, Ritsu Shiozumi
Basquash!, Child B (ep 2), Nyapico (ep 1)
Birdy the Mighty Decode:02, Shrine Maiden (ep 12)
K-On!, Mio Akiyama
Modern Magic Made Simple, Mio Kisaragi (ep 2), Official (ep 4)
Nogizaka Haruka no Himitsu: Purezza, Iwai Hinasaki & Yayoi Kayahara
Toradora!, Schoolgirl (ep 18)
Umineko no Naku Koro ni, Satan

2010
The Betrayal Knows My Name, Cartoon-character Costume (ep 11), Rina, Schoolgirl 1 (ep 8)
Chu-Bra!!, Kiyono Amahara
Demon King Daimao, Junko Hattori
Heaven's Lost Property Forte, Hiyori Kazane
Kakko-Kawaii Sengen!, Kao-chan
K-On!!, Mio Akiyama
MonHun Nikki Girigiri Airū-mura Airū Kiki Ippatsu, Caster
Occult Academy, Maya Kumashiro
Panty & Stocking with Garterbelt, Woman (ep 8A)
The Qwaser of Stigmata, Hana Katsuragi
Seitokai Yakuindomo, Shino Amakusa
Sekirei: Pure Engagement, Yashima
Stitch!: Zutto Saikō no Tomodachi, Reika
Working!!, Izumi Takanashi
Yumeiro Pâtissière, Katie Capucine

2011
Beelzebub, Azusa Fujisaki
Dog Days, Brioche d'Arquien
Hanasaku Iroha, Enishi Shijima (young)
Infinite Stratos, Houki Shinonono
Is This a Zombie?, Seraphim
Nura: Rise of the Yokai Clan: Demon Capital, Kyōkotsu's Daughter
Manyū Hiken-chō, Oume
MonHun Nikki Girigiri Airū-mura G, Nyaster
Moshidora, Minami Kawashima
The Qwaser of Stigmata II, Hana Katsuragi
Rio: Rainbow Gate!, Linda (LINDA-R-2007)
Ro-Kyu-Bu!, Saki Nagatsuka
Working'!!, Izumi Takanashi

2012
Aesthetica of a Rogue Hero, Myuu Ōsawa
Bodacious Space Pirates, Lynn Lambretta
Btooom!, Hidemi Kinoshita
Campione!, Erica Blandelli
Code:Breaker, Sakura Sakurakōji
Daily Lives of High School Boys, Literature Girl
Dog Days', Brioche d'Arquien
Gokujyo., Aya Akabane
Hayate the Combat Butler: Can't Take My Eyes Off You, Kayura Tsurugino
High School DxD, Rias Gremory
Hyouka, Quiz Study Group Chairman
Inu × Boku SS, Nobara Yukinokōji
Kingdom, Kyō Kai
Love, Election and Chocolate, Kimika Haida
Is This a Zombie? of the Dead, Seraphim
Say "I love you.", Female Student
Sengoku Collection, Vengeful Fang Akechi Mitsuhide
Medaka Box Abnormal, Saki Sukinasaki
Muv-Luv Alternative: Total Eclipse, Niram Rawamunando
Phi-Brain - Puzzle of God: The Orpheus Order, Mizerka
Tanken Driland, Haruka

2013
Cuticle Detective Inaba, Gabriella
Danganronpa: The Animation, Kyōko Kirigiri
Encouragement of Climb, Kaede Saitō
The Devil Is a Part-Timer!, Emi Yusa/Emilia Justina
Flowers of Evil, Nanako Saeki
Free!, Rei Ryugazaki (Young)
Haganai NEXT, Hinata Hidaka
Hayate the Combat Butler! Cuties, Kayura Tsurugino
High School DxD New, Rias Gremory
Infinite Stratos 2, Houki Shinonono
Karneval, Tsubaki
Kingdom 2, Kyō Kai
Majestic Prince, Kei Kugimiya
Pokémon: Black & White: Rival Destinies, Ellie
Ro-Kyu-Bu! SS, Saki Nagatsuka
Samurai Bride, Musashi Miyamoto
The Severing Crime Edge, Ruka Shihoudou
Senki Zesshō Symphogear G, Maria Cadenzavna Eve
Tamako Market, Hinako Kitashirakawa, Mari Uotani
Tanken Driland -1000-nen no Mahou-, Haruka

2014
Bladedance of Elementalers, Restia Ashdoll
Daimidaler the Sound Robot, Kyōko Sonan
Dai-Shogun - Great Revolution, Hyōgo Asai
Encouragement of Climb: Second Season, Kaede Saitō
The File of Young Kindaichi Returns, Runa Mizuki
Gonna be the Twin-Tail!!, Isna
Girl Friend BETA, Risa Shinomiya
Hanamonogatari, Higasa
If Her Flag Breaks, Rin Eiyūzaki
M3 the dark metal, Emiru Hazaki
Mushishi: The Next Chapter, Teru
Nobunaga The Fool, Jeanne Kaguya d'Arc
No Game No Life, Stephanie Dola
Phi Brain - Kami no Puzzle, Mizerka
Pokémon XY, Nami
Saki - The Nationals, Satoha Tsujigaito
Seitokai Yakuindomo*, Shino Amakusa
Sword Art Online II, Endô
Terraformars, Grace
Trinity Seven, Mira Yamana
Z/X Ignition, Michael

2015
Attack on Titan: Junior High, Frieda Reiss
Bikini Warriors, Fighter
Chivalry of a Failed Knight, Kanata Totokuba
Dog Days, Brioche d'Arquien
Fate/kaleid liner Prisma Illya 2wei Herz!, Hibari Kurihara
Food Wars: Shokugeki no Soma, Natsume Sendawara, Orie Sendawara
Gate: Jieitai Kano Chi nite, Kaku Tatakaeri, Yao Haa Dusi
High School DxD BorN, Rias Gremory
Is It Wrong to Try to Pick Up Girls in a Dungeon?, Freya
Maria the Virgin Witch, Artemis
Mobile Suit Gundam: Iron-Blooded Orphans, Lafter Frankland
My Monster Secret, Tōko Shiragami
Rampo Kitan: Game of Laplace, Kuro Tokage
Rin-ne, Rina Mizuki
Rokka: Braves of the Six Flowers, Nachetanya
Seraph of the End: Vampire Reign, Horn Skuld, Tomoe Saotome
Seraph of the End: Battle in Nagoya, Horn Skuld
Sound! Euphonium, Aoi Saitō, Brass Band Member
Subete ga F ni Naru, Ayako Shimada
Senki Zesshō Symphogear GX, Maria Cadenzavna Eve
Yurikuma Arashi, Kaoru Harishima
Working!!!, Izumi Takanashi

2016
Bakuon!!, Tazuko
Berserk, Farnese
Bubuki Buranki, Mami Horino / Zetsubi Hazama
Bubuki Buranki: The Gentle Giants of the Galaxy, Zetsubi Hazama, Double de Vaire 
Cheating Craft, Li Xing / Anri
Classicaloid, Kurage
Danganronpa 3: The End of Kibōgamine Gakuen, Kyoko Kirigiri
Dimension W, Cedric Morgan
Flip Flappers, Sayuri
Gate: Jieitai Kanochi nite, Kaku Tatakaeri - Enryuu-hen,  Yao Haa Dusi
Hitori no Shita the outcast, Natsuka
Keijo!!!!!!!!, Miku Kobayakawa
Macross Delta, Claire Paddle
Magi: Adventure of Sinbad, Esra
Magical Girl Raising Project, Ruler / Sanae Mokuou
New Game!, Kō Yagami
Long Riders!, Saki Takamiya
Phantasy Star Online 2 The Animation, Echo
Please Tell Me! Galko-chan, Galko's older sister, Protagonist (ep 11)
Pokémon: XY & Z, Amelia
Re:Zero -Starting Life in Another World-, Insane woman (ep 22)
Regalia: The Three Sacred Stars, Ryu (ep 6)
Sweetness and Lightning, Mikio's mother
Sound! Euphonium 2, Aoi Saitō
The Great Passage, Midori Kishibe
The Morose Mononokean, Kōra
Undefeated Bahamut Chronicle, Relie Aingram
WWW.Working!!, Sayuri Muranushi

2017
Aho Girl, Yoshie Hanabatake
Aikatsu Stars!, Elza Forte
Altair: A Record of Battles, Shara
Berserk 2nd Season, Farnese
The Eccentric Family 2, Gyokuran
Fuuka, Tomomi-sensei
Hand Shakers, Bind
Interviews with Monster Girls, Sakie Satō
Juni Taisen: Zodiac War, Toshiko Inō/Boar
Little Witch Academia, Diana Cavendish
New Game!!, Kō Yagami
Piace: My Italian Cooking, Ruri Fujiki
Re:Creators, Alicetelia February
Sakura Quest, young Chitose Oribe
Seven Mortal Sins, Greed Demon Lord Mammon
Senki Zesshō Symphogear AXZ, Maria Cadenzavna Eve

2018
Attack on Titan Season 3, Frieda Reiss
BanG Dream! Girls Band Party! Pico, Tomoe Udagawa
Dances with the Dragons, Jivunya Lorezzo
Encouragement of Climb: Third Season, Kaede Saitō
Goblin Slayer, Witch
High School DxD Hero, Rias Gremory
Hinamatsuri, Utako
Hakyū Hoshin Engi, So Dakki
Junji Ito Collection, Riko
Layton Mystery Tanteisha: Katori no Nazotoki File, Olivia (Episode 2)
Pop Team Epic, Popuko (Episode 4-A)
Sword Art Online Alternative Gun Gale Online, Pitohui

2019
Aikatsu Friends!, Hibiki Tenshō
Arifureta: From Commonplace to World's Strongest, Tio Klarus
BanG Dream! 2nd Season, Tomoe Udagawa
Domestic Girlfriend, Hina Tachibana
Granbelm, Anna Fugo
Isekai Cheat Magician, Grami
Is It Wrong to Try to Pick Up Girls in a Dungeon? Season 2, Freya
Magical Girl Spec-Ops Asuka, Rau Peipei
Manaria Friends, Anne
No Guns Life, Olivier Juan de Belmer
Phantasy Star Online 2: Episode Oracle as Echo
Revisions, Chiharu Isurugi
Senki Zesshō Symphogear XV, Maria Cadenzavna Eve
To the Abandoned Sacred Beasts, Liza Runecastle
W'z, Yukine
Zoids Wild Zero, Jo Aysel

2020
BanG Dream! 3rd Season, Tomoe Udagawa
BanG Dream! Girls Band Party! Pico: Ohmori, Tomoe Udagawa
Case Closed episodes 990-991, An Oide
Dragon Quest: The Adventure of Dai, Zulbon
Dropout Idol Fruit Tart, Hoho Kajino
ID: Invaded, Keiko Kikuchi (ep 4)
Infinite Dendrogram, Marie Adler 
Interspecies Reviewers, Aloe
Is It Wrong to Try to Pick Up Girls in a Dungeon? Season 3, Freya
Is the Order a Rabbit? BLOOM, Student Council President
Jujutsu Kaisen, Utahime Iori
Listeners, Stür Neubauten
Pocket Monsters 2019, Saitō (Bea)
Sorcerous Stabber Orphen, Azalie Cait Sith
The Irregular at Magic High School: Visitor Arc, Angelina Kudou Shields
The Millionaire Detective Balance: Unlimited, Yoko (ep 1)
Tower of God, Hwa Ryun / Karen
Wandering Witch: The Journey of Elaina, Sheila

2021
BanG Dream! Girls Band Party! Pico Fever!, Tomoe Udagawa
The Case Study of Vanitas, Veronica de Sade
Cells at Work! Code Black, White Blood Cell (Neutrophilc)
The Great Jahy Will Not Be Defeated!, Landlord
Life Lessons with Uramichi Oniisan, Mabui Daga
Moriarty the Patriot, Irene Adler/James Bond 
Night Head 2041, Kimie Kobayashi
Redo of Healer, Keara
Shaman King, Yoh Asakura
Shadows House, Dorothy 
The Fruit of Evolution, Louise Balze 
The Vampire Dies in No Time, Maria 
Vivy: Fluorite Eye's Song, Estella
 Lupin the 3rd Part 6, Diner Waitress (Episode 4)

2022
A Couple of Cuckoos, Namie Umino
Arifureta: From Commonplace to World's Strongest 2nd Season, Tio Klarus
Arknights: Prelude to Dawn, Kal'tsit
Call of the Night, Kiyosumi Shirakawa
Encouragement of Climb: Next Summit, Kaede Saitō
Extreme Hearts, RiN
Fanfare of Adolescence, Akari Sumeragi
Love of Kill, Mifa
My Stepmom's Daughter Is My Ex, Madoka Tanesato
Orient, Kuroko Usami
Princess Connect! Re:Dive Season 2, Nozomi
RPG Real Estate, Satona
RWBY: Ice Queendom, Weiss Schnee
Summer Time Rendering, Hizuru Minakata
The Devil Is a Part-Timer!!, Emi Yusa/Emilia Justina
The Eminence in Shadow, Iris Midgar
The Genius Prince's Guide to Raising a Nation Out of Debt, Fyshe Blundell

2023
A Galaxy Next Door, Momoka Morikuni
Giant Beasts of Ars, Romana
Goblin Slayer II, Witch
Level 1 Demon Lord and One Room Hero, Zenia
Shangri-La Frontier, Arthur Pencilgon/Towa Amane
The Vexations of a Shut-In Vampire Princess, Karen Helvetius

2024
Highspeed Etoile, Kanata Asakawa
Shaman King: Flowers, Hana Asakura

TBA
Arifureta: From Commonplace to World's Strongest 3rd Season, Tio Klarus

Drama CD
Wanna Be the Strongest in the World (2011), Elena Miyazawa
Watashi ni xx Shinasai! (2012), Yukina Himuro
Taiyō no Ie (2012), Chihiro
Last Game (2015–2016), Mikoto Kujō
A Terrified Teacher at Ghoul School, Beniko Zashiki
The Apothecary Diaries (2020), Gyokuyō

Original video animation (OVA)
Final Fantasy VII Advent Children Complete (2009), Edge Citizen
Code Geass: Akito the Exiled (2012), Kousaka Ayano
Yozakura Quartet: Tsuki ni Naku (2013), Nadeshiko Matsudaira
Yankee-kun na Yamada-kun to Megane-chan to Majo (2015), Hana Adachi

Original net animation (ONA)
Comical Psychosomatic Medicine (2015), Iyashi Kangoshi
Eyedrops (2016), Neostigmine Methylsulfate
Miru Tights (2019), Yua Nakabeni
7 Seeds (2019), Hana Sugurono
Vlad Love (2021), Jinko Sumida
High-Rise Invasion (2021), Yayoi Kusakabe
Bastard!! -Heavy Metal, Dark Fantasy- (2022), Arshes Nei
Junji Ito Maniac: Japanese Tales of the Macabre (2023), Chiemi
Romantic Killer (2022), Yukana Kishi
Pluto (2023), Atom

Theatrical animation
Keroro Gunso the Super Movie 3: Keroro vs. Keroro Great Sky Duel (2008), Woman C
Heaven's Lost Property the Movie: The Angeloid of Clockwork (2011), Hiyori Kazane
K-On! the Movie (2011), Mio Akiyama
Hayate the Combat Butler! Heaven Is a Place on Earth (2011), Kayura Tsurugino
Inazuma Eleven GO vs. Danbōru Senki W (2012), Fran
Hal (2013), Kurumi
A Certain Magical Index: The Movie – The Miracle of Endymion (2013), Shutaura Sequenzia
Little Witch Academia (2013), Diana Cavendish
Planetarian: Storyteller of the Stars (2016), Job
Majestic Prince: Genetic Awakening (2016), Kei Kugimiya
Trinity Seven the Movie: The Eternal Library and the Alchemist Girl (2017), Mira Yamana
Seitokai Yakuindomo: The Movie (2017), Shino Amakusa
The Irregular at Magic High School: The Movie – The Girl Who Summons the Stars (2017), Angelina Kudou Shields
No Game No Life: Zero (2017), Corounne Dola
Maquia: When the Promised Flower Blooms (2018), Tita
BanG Dream! Film Live (2019), Tomoe Udagawa
Trinity Seven: Heavens Library & Crimson Lord (2019), Mira Yamana
Goblin Slayer: Goblin's Crown (2020), Witch
BanG Dream! Episode of Roselia (2021), Tomoe Udagawa
BanG Dream! Film Live 2nd Stage (2021), Tomoe Udagawa
Seitokai Yakuindomo: The Movie 2 (2021), Shino Amakusa
Eien no 831 (2022), Akina
Rakudai Majo: Fūka to Yami no Majo (2023), Megaira

Video games

Granado Espada (2006), Berroniff
Megazone 23: Aoi Garland (2007), Mami Nakagawa
Ken to Mahou to Gakuen Mono (2008), Female Gnome
K-On! Hōkago Live!! (2010), Mio Akiyama
Danganronpa: Trigger Happy Havoc (2010), Kyōko Kirigiri
Umineko no Naku koro ni: Majo to Suiri no Rondo (2010), Satan
L@ve once (2010), Meru Toritome
Black Rock Shooter: The Game (2011), Shizu
Umineko no Naku koro ni Chiru: Shinjitsu to Gensō no Nocturne (2011), Satan
Lollipop Chainsaw (2012), Juliet Starling (as default setting in PS3 Japanese version)
Phantasy Star Online 2 (2012), Echo
Senran Kagura Shinovi Versus (2013), Ryōbi
Super Heroine Chronicle (2014), Houki Shinonono
Granblue Fantasy (2014), Anne, Selfira
Makai Shin Trillion (2015), Faust
Senran Kagura: Estival Versus (2015), Ryōbi
Valkyrie Drive: Bhikkhuni (2015), Momo Kuzuryū
Lord of Vermilion Arena (2015), Yaiba
7th Dragon 2020 (2011)
7th Dragon 2020-II (2013)
7th Dragon III code:VFD (2016)
Dragon Quest Heroes II (2016), Minea
Fushigi no Gensokyo 3 (2014), Marisa Kirisame
Touhou Genso Wanderer (2015), Marisa Kirisame
 The Alchemist Code (2016), Agatha 
Fushigi no Gensokyo TOD -RELOADED- (2016), Marisa Kirisame
Super Robot Wars OG: The Moon Dwellers (2016), Katia Grineal
Street Fighter V (2016), Laura Matsuda
Breath of Fire 6 (2016), Protagonist (Female)
Girls' Frontline (2016), K11, Lewis
World of Final Fantasy (2016), Refia
Senki Zesshō Symphogear XD Unlimited (2017), Maria Cadenzavna Eve
Kirara Fantasia (2017),   Kanna
Infinite Stratos: Archetype Breaker (2017), Houki Shinonono
Fire Emblem Heroes (2017), Fir, Athena
BanG Dream! Girls Band Party! (2017), Tomoe Udagawa
Xenoblade Chronicles 2 (2017), Nyuutsu
BlazBlue: Cross Tag Battle (2018), Weiss Schnee
Azur Lane (2017), USS Honolulu, USS St. Louis
Sdorica (2018), Hyacinthus Folrey, Hyacinthus SP
Super Neptunia RPG (2018), Kukei
Dragalia Lost (2018), Celliera
Arknights (2019), Kal'tsit
Our World is Ended (2019), Yoko Ichinose
Pokémon Masters EX (2019), Elesa
Girls X Battle 2 – Fencer
Fate/Grand Order (2020), Kijyo Koyo
Another Eden (2020), Heena
Moe! Ninja Girls RPG (2020), Enju Saion-ji
Love Live! School Idol Festival All Stars (2020), Kaoruko Mifune
Persona 5 Strikers (2020), Kuon Ichinose
Atri: My Dear Moments (2020), Catherine
Magia Record (2021), Tsubaki Mikoto
The Legend of Heroes: Kuro no Kiseki (2021), Judith Ranster
Alchemy Stars (2021), Regina, Jona
Counter:Side (2021), Hilde
Fairy Fencer F: Refrain Chord (2022), Glace
The Legend of Heroes: Kuro no Kiseki II – Crimson Sin (2022), Judith Ranster
Star Ocean: The Divine Force (2022), Malkya Trathen
Echocalypse (2022), Niz
Goddess of Victory: Nikke (2022), Neve
Dragon Quest Treasures (2022), Bonnie, Monsters
Fire Emblem Engage (2023), Ivy
Cookie Run: Kingdom (2023), Blueberry Pie Cookie

Dubbing roles

Live-action
Against the Dark, Charlotte (Skye Bennett)
Alex Rider, Kyra Vashenko-Chao (Marli Siu)
Captain Marvel, Minn-Erva (Gemma Chan)
Cleveland Abduction, Gina DeJesus (Katie Sarife)
Escape Room: Tournament of Champions, Claire (Isabelle Fuhrman)
Ghostbusters: Afterlife, Lucky Domingo (Celeste O'Connor)
Good Sam, Dr. Lex Trulie (Skye P. Marshall)
Magadheera, Mithravinda / Indu (Kajal Aggarwal)
The Nevers, Mary Brighton (Eleanor Tomlinson)
Scream 4, Jill Roberts (Emma Roberts)

Animation
Chuggington, Piper
The Loud House, Lori (Catherine Taber) and Lucy (Jessica DiCicco)
The Casagrandes, Lori (Catherine Taber) and Lucy (Jessica DiCicco)
RWBY, Weiss Schnee

Discography

Singles & albums
As the voice actor for Mio Akiyama in K-On!, she participated to four singles and two albums.

 "Cagayake! Girls" ranked #2 on Japanese Oricon singles charts.
 "Don't say 'lazy'" ranked #3 on Oricon singles charts, and was awarded Animation Kobe's "Best Song" award.
  ranked #3 on Oricon singles charts.
  ranked #2 on Oricon singles charts.
  ranked #1 on Oricon albums charts.

Below are singles under her own name.
 , used as the ending theme for the anime series Attack on Titan.
 , used as the theme song for the anime movie Hal.
 , used as the ending theme for the anime series Diamond no Ace.
 , used as the opening theme for the anime series Z/X Ignition.
 "Rhythm Dimension" along with Shiina-Tactix.

Below are albums under her own name.
Glamorous Songs (July 17, 2013)
Couleur (September 3, 2014)

DVD/Blu-ray
 Hikasa Yoko GLAMOROUS LIVE Blu-ray & DVD released date: April 16, 2014.
 Hikasa Yoko Live Tour Le Tour de Couleur Blu-ray & DVD released date: March 18, 2015.

References

External links
  
 Official agency profile 
 
 

1985 births
Living people
Anime singers
I'm Enterprise voice actors
Japanese women pop singers
Japanese video game actresses
Japanese voice actresses
Musicians from Kanagawa Prefecture
Voice actresses from Kanagawa Prefecture
21st-century Japanese actresses
21st-century Japanese women singers
21st-century Japanese singers